Cave Rock may refer to:

 Cave Rock (location), a stone formation in Nevada, US
 Cave Rock (horse), an American Thoroughbred race horse 
 Cave Rock Tunnel, a dual bore highway tunnel on U.S. Route 50 

Other:

 Cave-In-Rock, Illinois,  a village in Hardin County, Illinois, US
 Cave-in-Rock State Park, state park in Illinois, US
 Orgasm (Cromagnon album), 1969 album by Cromagnon, later reissued under the title Cave Rock